The men's heavyweight competition in powerlifting at the 2017 World Games took place on 25 July 2017 at the National Forum of Music in Wrocław, Poland.

Competition format
A total of 11 athletes entered the competition. Each athlete had 3 attempts in each of 3 events: squat, bench press and deadlift. The athlete with the biggest score in Wilks points is the winner.

Results

References 

 
2017 World Games